Chimères, French for chimeras, may refer to:

 The Chimeras, an 1853 sequence of sonnets by Gérard de Nerval
 Les Chimères (painting), an 1884 painting by Gustave Moreau
 Chimères (film), a 2013 film directed by Olivier Beguin
 Chimères (pour Ondes Martenot), a 2020 album by Christine Ott

See also
 Chimera (disambiguation)